West Horndon railway station is on the London, Tilbury and Southend line, serving the village of West Horndon situated on the boundary of the boroughs of Brentwood and Thurrock, Essex. Its three-letter station code is WHR.

History 
It was renamed West Horndon in 1949.

There were formerly three east-facing sidings to the north and east of the station, these closed in September 1964. An east-facing sidings to the north and west of the station connected to the premises of Brown and Tawse Limited.

Previously in the latter part of the 20th century in about 1998 the station building on the London-bound platform had been demolished. A more modern structure was erected, which provides very little shelter, unlike the original building.

During the latter part of 2008 the ticket hall, customer toilets and ticket office were refurbished. Automatic doors were provided between the street and the ticket hall, and to and from the platform.

Services 
The station and all trains serving it are currently operated by c2c.

The station's ticket office is open Monday to Saturday; due to the low patronage it is closed on Sunday and public holidays. The ticket office has one serving window and uses the TRIBUTE issuing system. The ticket hall has three automatic ticket gates.

The typical off-peak service is:
 2 trains per hour to London Fenchurch Street. 
 2 trains per hour to Shoeburyness via Basildon.

References

External links 

Railway stations in Essex
DfT Category E stations
Transport in the Borough of Brentwood
Transport in Thurrock
Former London, Tilbury and Southend Railway stations
Railway stations in Great Britain opened in 1886
Railway stations served by c2c